Marina de Van (born 8 February 1971) is a French film director, screenwriter and actress. Her film, Don't Look Back, was screened out of competition at the 2009 Cannes Film Festival. 

In her directing debut In My Skin in 2002, he played an intern.

Selected filmography
 See the Sea (1997) (actress, writer)
 Sitcom (1998) (actress)
 8 Women (2002) (writer)
 In My Skin (2002) (writer/director)
 La clef (2007) (actress)
 Don't Look Back (2009) (writer/director)
 Le petit poucet (2010) (director/collaborating writer)
 Dark Touch (2012) (writer/director)

Further reading
Tim Palmer "Don't Look Back: An Interview with Marina de Van," The French Review, 83:5, April 2010, pp. 96–103
Tim Palmer, "Under Your Skin: Marina de Van and the Contemporary French Cinema du Corps,"Studies in French Cinema, 6:3, Fall 2006, pp. 171–181

References

External links

1971 births
Living people
French film directors
French film actresses
French women film directors
French women screenwriters
French screenwriters